Kazem Seddiqi (born 4 March 1951, sometimes with the honorific Ayatollah, and surname anglicised as Sedighi) is an Iranian Shia scholar and Mujtahid currently serving as Tehran's Friday Prayer Temporary Imam. A rival of President Ahmadinejad, Seddiqi was appointed as interim Friday prayers leader for Tehran by Ayatollah Khamenei in 1 August 2009. The New York Times characterized the appointment as part of an effort to "reinforce [Khamenei's] authority by cultivating divisions between factions" following the controversial June presidential election.

Among the targets of criticism in Seddiqi's khutbahs have been "certain regional countries for `supporting` the leader of the Jundallah terrorist group, Abdolmalek Rigi", the United States President Barack Obama for showing his "ugly face" by preparing a new slate of sanctions against Iran, and women who wear immodest clothing and behave promiscuously, which Seddiqi claims causes earthquakes to occur. In response to the latter statement, hundreds of thousands of women around the world, organized through social-networking sites such as Facebook and Twitter, declared April 26, 2010, to be "Boobquake day", in which they all agreed to wear immodest clothing on the same day.

See also 

 Seyyed Ahmad Khatami
 Seyyed Ali Akbar Aboutorabi Fard

References

External links

1951 births
Living people
Islam-related controversies
People from Abhar
Combatant Clergy Association politicians
Iranian ayatollahs